Juggernaut: Omega is the fourth studio album by American progressive metal band Periphery. It's the second part of a double album, the first part of which is Juggernaut: Alpha. The double album was released on January 27, 2015, by Sumerian Records. Juggernaut: Omega debuted at No. 25 on the U.S. Billboard 200.

Critical reception

Juggernaut: Omega received critical acclaim. In a review for Exclaim!, Calum Slingerland wrote that Omega is very much the "yin to Alpha's yang," highlighted by "the jerky chugging of "The Bad Thing," the thrashy "Graveless" and the slow-burning "Hell Below," which comes complete with a tasteful jazz-fusion outro." AntiHero Magazine called the Juggernaut albums as a whole Periphery's "magnum opus", specifically praising the vocals.

Track listing

Personnel 
Writing, performance and production credits are adapted from the album liner notes.

Periphery
 Spencer Sotelo – vocals
 Misha Mansoor – guitar
 Jake Bowen – guitar
 Mark Holcomb – guitar
 Adam "Nolly" Getgood – bass
 Matt Halpern – drums

Production
 Periphery – production
 Spencer Sotelo – production (vocals only)
 Adam "Nolly" Getgood – engineering, mixing
 Taylor Larson – additional engineering (at Oceanic Recording)
 Ernie Slenkovic – additional engineering (at Oceanic Recording)
 Eric Emery – additional engineering (at Emery Recording Studios)
 Ermin Hamidovic – mastering

Artwork and design
 Justin Randall – cover illustration
 Tim Swim – additional illustration
 Daniel McBride – layout, design

Studios
 Oceanic Recording – engineering
 Emery Recording Studios – engineering
 Top Secret Audio – mixing
 Systematic Productions – mastering

Charts

References

2015 albums
Periphery (band) albums
Sumerian Records albums
Century Media Records albums
Roadrunner Records albums
Distort Entertainment albums